Carolus is the name given to a number of gold coins:
a coin struck during the reign of Charles I of England. It was originally valued at 20 shillings, but later 23. 
the Carolusgulden first minted by Charles V (Holy Roman Empire) in 1517, see Dutch Guilder#History
 the Carolus dollar, a Spanish-American peso or  piece of eight issued by  Charles III (1759-88) and  Charles IV (1788-1808) of Spain.

References

Gold coins